Sameer Dharmadhikari is an Indian film and television actor and model Popular for Playing the Role of Samrat Bindusara Maurya in Chakravartin Ashoka Samrat . He played the male lead in the Marathi film Nirop that won the National Award for the Best Marathi film.

He has worked as a hydraulic machine designer and did theatre in Pune. After moving to Mumbai, he modeled for Vimal Suitings, De Beers, ICICI Bank, Nescafé   and was brand ambassador for Raymond Suitings.

Filmography

Films

Television

Web series

References

External links
 

Living people
Male actors in Hindi cinema
Male actors in Marathi cinema
Male actors in Marathi theatre
Male actors from Pune
Indian male television actors
Marathi actors
1978 births
Indian male stage actors
21st-century Indian male actors
People from Pune